Flemington is a borough in Clinton County, Pennsylvania, United States. The population was 1,330 at the 2010 census. 

In 1770, Squire John Flemming, who later was a Revolutionary War soldier, purchased about 1650 acres situated between Bald Eagle Creek and the West branch of the Susquehanna River encompassing much of present day Lock Haven and Flemington (named after the family).  The Flemings built a large  house on the bank of the river close to the southern abutment of a nearby dam and it could be seen from the highway between Flemington and Lock Haven.  

The Flemings were descended from the Earl of Wigton of Scotland, and had their own coat of arms.  They were among the first settlers of the area.

Geography
Flemington is located in southern Clinton County at  (41.126246, -77.469943), along Bald Eagle Creek and the remnant of the Bald Eagle Crosscut Canal. It is bordered to the east by the city of Lock Haven, the county seat.

Pennsylvania Route 150 passes through the center of Flemington, leading northeast into Lock Haven and southwest  to Mill Hall.

Demographics

As of the census of 2000, there were 1,319 people, 588 households, and 398 families residing in the borough. The racial makeup of the borough was 98.94% White, 0.23% African American, 0.08% Native American, 0.45% Asian, and 0.30% from two or more races. Hispanic or Latino of any race were 0.30% of the population.

There were 588 households, out of which 22.4% had children under the age of 18 living with them, 56.5% were married couples living together, 7.7% had a female householder with no husband present, and 32.3% were non-families. 27.7% of all households were made up of individuals, and 17.0% had someone living alone who was 65 years of age or older. The average household size was 2.24 and the average family size was 2.70.

In the borough the population was spread out, with 18.2% under the age of 18, 8.1% from 18 to 24, 26.6% from 25 to 44, 24.9% from 45 to 64, and 22.1% who were 65 years of age or older. The median age was 42 years. For every 100 females, there were 93.4 males. For every 100 females age 18 and over, there were 90.6 males.

The median income for a household in the borough was $29,750, and the median income for a family was $36,776. Males had a median income of $28,333 versus $20,588 for females. The per capita income for the borough was $16,924. About 6.8% of families and 10.0% of the population were below the poverty line, including 13.0% of those under age 18 and 4.7% of those age 65 or over.

References

External links
Borough of Flemington official website

Pennsylvania populated places on the Susquehanna River
Populated places established in 1838
Boroughs in Clinton County, Pennsylvania
1864 establishments in Pennsylvania